Wendell Edward Young (born August 1, 1963) is a Canadian former professional ice hockey goaltender. He is currently the general manager of the Chicago Wolves of the American Hockey League.

Wendell's moniker is "Ringmaster" as he is  currently the only player in hockey history to have won all four cups:  the Memorial Cup, Calder Cup, Turner Cup and Stanley Cup.

His Chicago Wolves Jersey #1 was retired in a ceremony at their home rink, The Allstate Arena, (Rosemont, IL) on December 1, 2001. All four cups were on hand to honor his history making achievements. This marked the first time The Chicago Wolves had retired a number since their inception into the then titled IHL (International Hockey League) in 1994.

Playing career

Young played for the Vancouver Canucks, Philadelphia Flyers, Pittsburgh Penguins and Tampa Bay Lightning in the National Hockey League. Young is the only hockey player to have won a Memorial Cup (in 1982 with the Kitchener Rangers), a Calder Cup (with the 1988 Hershey Bears and as a manager with the 2022 Chicago Wolves), a Turner Cup (with the 1998 and 2000 Chicago Wolves), and a Stanley Cup (with the 1991 and 1992 Penguins).  He also has 2 Robertson Cups with the Kitchener Rangers as Ontario Hockey League Champions in 1981 and 1982.

Career statistics

Regular season and playoffs

External links
 
Wendell Young at Hockey Goalies

1963 births
Atlanta Knights players
Canadian expatriate ice hockey players in the United States
Canadian ice hockey coaches
Calgary Flames coaches
Canadian ice hockey goaltenders
Chicago Wolves (IHL) players
Fredericton Express players
Hershey Bears players
Ice hockey people from Nova Scotia
Kitchener Rangers players
Living people
Milwaukee Admirals (IHL) players
Muskegon Lumberjacks players
Philadelphia Flyers players
Pittsburgh Penguins players
Salt Lake Golden Eagles (CHL) players
Sportspeople from Halifax, Nova Scotia
Stanley Cup champions
Tampa Bay Lightning players
Vancouver Canucks draft picks
Vancouver Canucks players